Highway 343 (AR 343, Ark. 343, and Hwy. 343) is a designation for three state highways in the Arkansas Grand Prairie. A second route begins at Highway 152 and runs  to US Highway 63 (US 63) and US 79 west of Stuttgart. All three routes are maintained by the Arkansas Department of Transportation (ArDOT).

Route description
All three routes are short, two-lane, low-traffic rural highways located in the Grand Prairie, a flat agricultural area crossed by lakes and bayou known for rice cultivation and aquaculture.

South Arkansas County
The southern terminus is at Wheeler Lake Road, with the roadway continuing south as Pat Lane. The highway runs north as a section line road until an intersection with Highway 11, where it terminates. As of 2016, the route had an annual average daily traffic (AADT) of 90 vehicles per day (VPD).

West Arkansas County
Highway 343 begins at an intersection with Highway 152 a few miles east of the Bayou Meto Wildlife Management Area (WMA). It runs north as a section line road across King Bayou, with two small jogs turning the highway east–west. It terminates at US 63/US 79 west of Stuttgart. As of 2016, the route had an AADT of 200 VPD.

Prairie County
Highway 343 begins at U.S 165 in the southern tip of Prairie County. It runs north as a section line road west of the Stuttgart Municipal Airport. The highway continues past county road intersections, aquaculture ponds, drainage ditches, and fields. The route terminates at Highway 86 near Slovak. As of 2016, the route had an AADT of 150 VPD.

History
Two routes of Highway 343 were created by the Arkansas State Highway Commission (ASHC) on October 27, 1965. The highway in southern Arkansas County was created November 23, 1966.

Major intersections

See also

References

External links

343
Transportation in Arkansas County, Arkansas
Transportation in Prairie County, Arkansas